Aldrin is a small impact crater located on the southern part of the Mare Tranquillitatis, to the east of Sabine. It is located about 50 kilometers to the northwest of the Apollo 11 landing site, Tranquility Base. Named after Buzz Aldrin, the crater is the westernmost of a row of three craters named in honor of the Apollo 11 crew members. About 30 kilometers to the east is the landing site of the Surveyor 5 lunar probe.

This crater was previously identified as Sabine B before being named by the IAU.  Sabine itself is to the west of Aldrin.

See also
 6470 Aldrin
 Armstrong (crater)
 Collins (crater)

References

 
 
 
 
 
 
 
 
 
 
 

Impact craters on the Moon
Apollo 11
Buzz Aldrin